The Moroccan diaspora, part of the wider Arab diaspora, consists of emigrants from Morocco and their descendants. An estimated five million Moroccans live abroad, with the majority of the diaspora being located in Europe, and especially France.

Diaspora by region

Europe 
Moroccans are one of the largest migrant populations in Europe, with the Moroccan diaspora community living in France  estimated at 1,146,000, Spain 766,000, Italy 487,000, the Netherlands 363,000, Belgium 298,000 and Germany 127,000.

Religion 
The Moroccan diaspora is mainly composed of Sunni Muslims, along with a substanial amount of Moroccan Jews. There is also a minority of Shia Muslims as well as a few Christians.

See also
Moroccans
Moroccans in France
Maghrebi communities of Paris
Moroccans in Spain
Moroccan people in Italy
Moroccans in Belgium
Moroccan-Dutch
Moroccans in Germany
Moroccan Canadians
Moroccan American
Moroccans in Sweden
British Moroccans

References

External links
Official website of the Minister delegate in charge of Moroccans living abroad
Moroccan Diaspora Social Website
Moroccan Diaspora Community Website